Vladimír Vávra (8 January 1905 – 26 December 1932) was a Czech wrestler. He competed in the men's Greco-Roman lightweight at the 1928 Summer Olympics. Vávra committed suicide in 1932.

References

External links
 

1905 births
1932 suicides
People from Prague-East District
People from the Kingdom of Bohemia
Czech male sport wrestlers
Olympic wrestlers of Czechoslovakia
Wrestlers at the 1928 Summer Olympics
Suicides in Czechoslovakia
Suicides in the Czech Republic
Sportspeople from the Central Bohemian Region